Trichromia occidentalis is a moth in the subfamily Arctiinae. It was described by Walter Rothschild in 1909. It is found in French Guiana, Ecuador and the Brazilian state of Amazonas.

Subspecies
Trichromia occidentalis occidentalis
Trichromia occidentalis roseola (Watson & Goodger, 1986)

References

Moths described in 1909
occidentalis